This is a list of devices which can record video in 4K resolution. As digital video authoring systems could be considered re-recording systems, these should be included.

Professional cameras

 Arri Alexa
 Astrodesign AH-4413 – released in 2012 and records at 3840×2160 (8.3 megapixels)
 AXIOM is an open source hardware modular camera that allows users to swap sensors. For research and development the ams Sensors Belgium CMV12000 was used, which allows the camera to record up to 300 fps (10 bit), 132 fps (12 bit) at 4K Resolution
Blackmagic Pocket Cinema Camera 6k
Blackmagic Pocket Cinema Camera 4k
Blackmagic URSA
Blackmagic Micro Studio Camera 4K
 Blackmagic Production Camera 4K – announced April 8, 2013
 Canon EOS C500 – released in 2012 and records in DCI 4K
 Dalsa Origin – released in 2003 and records at 4096×2048 (8.3 megapixels). The Dalsa Origin II is no longer available. Dalsa discontinued the Digital Cinema division in 2008. The Origin II was available via a rental-only model similar to Panavision.
 FOR-A FT-ONE – records 4K at up to 900 FPS
 JVC GY-HMQ10 – released in 2012 and records at UHD 4K (3840×2160, 8.3 megapixels)
 Panasonic HC-X1000, 2014 – capable to record in 4K (3840 × 2160) and Cinema 4K (4096 × 2160), 60p/50p, 20× optical zoom, built-in ND filter.
 Panasonic HC-X1500, 2020
 Panasonic HC-X2000, 2020
 Panasonic DVX-200 – 4k 60fps
 Point Grey FL3-U3-88S2C-C 8.8 MP Color USB 3.0 – released in 2012 and records at DCI 4K (the framerate is limited to 21 fps)
 RED EPIC – released in 2011 and records at 5K RAW (5120×2700 13.8 megapixels) & DCI 4K (4096×2160, 8.8 megapixels)
 RED Scarlet-X – released in November 2011
 RED ONE – released in 2007 and records at 4096×2304 (11.5 megapixels)
Sony F65
Sony F5
Sony F55
Sony VENICE
 Sony Handycam FDR-AX1
 Sony XDCAM PXW-Z100
 Vision Research Phantom 65 - no longer in production
 Vision Research Phantom Flex 4K - records 4K @ up to 1000 FPS - previewed on April 8, 2013

DSLRs and Mirrorless cameras
Blackmagic Pocket Cinema Camera 6k
Blackmagic Pocket Cinema Camera 4k
Canon EOS-1D C DSLR – Released in 2012 and records at DCI 4K
 Canon EOS-1D X Mark II – 60p Introduced in Feb 2016
Canon EOS-1D X Mark III – First Full Frame Canon DSLR to feature full sensor width 4K readout, and also first Canon camera to record in HEVC codec
 Canon EOS 5D Mark IV - Full Frame with 4K introduced in August 2016
 Canon EOS M50
 Canon EOS 200D II
 Canon EOS 90D – First APS-C Canon DSLR to feature full sensor width 4K readout
 Canon EOS M6 Mark II
 Canon EOS R
 Canon EOS RP
 Canon EOS R5
 Canon EOS R6
 Canon EOS R7
 Fujifilm X-A7
 Fujifilm X-E3
 Fujifilm X-H1
 Fujifilm X-T100 – 4K/15p
 Fujifilm X-T2
 Fujifilm X-T3 - released in 2018 as the first Fujifilm camera to record in HEVC codec
 Fujifilm X-T4
 Fujifilm X-T20
 Fujifilm X-T30
 Leica CL
 Leica SL (Typ 601)
 Leica TL2
 Nikon D5 - 30p Introduced in Jan 2016
 Nikon D500 - 30p Introduced in Jan 2016
 Nikon D7500
 Nikon D850
 Nikon 1 J5 (limited to 15 FPS)
 Panasonic Lumix DMC-G7 - 30 min limit
 Panasonic Lumix DMC-G85/G80 - No time limit in 4K recording and in body image stabilisation (Europe version has 30 min limit)
 Panasonic Lumix DC-G9
 Panasonic Lumix DMC-GH4 – Records in 4K: 4096×2160 / 24p and QFHD (UHD) 4K: 3840×2160 / 25p/30p, up to 100 Mbit/s (IPB), HD (All Intra up to 200 Mbit/s/IPB 100 Mbit/s) only prosumer device with 10-bit hdmi out and no maximum internal 4k recording time limit
 Panasonic Lumix DC-GH5 - 4K60/50p (4:2:0 8bit) & 4K30/25p/24p (4:2:2 10bit) internal recording, up to 4K60 4:2:2 10bit external recording via HDMI
 Panasonic Lumix DC-GH5S
 Panasonic Lumix DMC-GX8 - No time limit in 4K recording and in body image stabilisation (Europe version has 30 min limit)
 Panasonic Lumix DMC-GX85/GX80
 Panasonic Lumix DC-S1, released 2019
 Panasonic Lumix DC-S5, released 2021 – 4K 60fps (200 Mbit/s with HEVC, 150 Mbit/s H.264);  DCi 4K at 30fps (150 Mbit/s; 4:2:2 chroma subsampling);
 Pentax K-3 III - 30p Introduced in March 2021
 Samsung NX1 - First prosumer camera to record in HEVC, 4K downsampled from 6.5K, 80 Mbit/s in H.265. 30 min max recording time limit
 Samsung NX500 - Same 28 MP APS-C sensor as NXI but 4K video is not downsampled from 6.5K so less details and more noise than the NX1 - with this 2.4× crop factor the kit lens become a 38–120mm f8.5–13.4 equivalent for depth of field; 15 min max recording time limit
 Sony α6100
 Sony α6300 - APS-C camera with internal 4K recording up to 100 Mbit/s. The camera uses a 20 MP (6K) region of the sensor to offer 2.4× oversampled 4K video with full pixel readout, and no pixel binning.
 Sony α6400
 Sony α6500
 Sony α6600
 Sony α7 III
 Sony α7R II - Full Frame 42 Megapixel Sensor, but only 100 Mbit/s in H.264 and the APS-C crop mode is better for 4K than the full frame mode
 Sony α7R III
 Sony α7S - 4K: 30p/24p, 4:2:2 8 bits. Does not support internal 4K recording, must use an external recorder via HDMI, but see Sony α7S II. Only 1080p is recorded internally.
 Sony α7S II - Full Frame with internal 4K recording
 Sony α9 - XAVC S 4K: 3840 x 2160 (30p/25p/24p), 4:2:0 8bit
 Sony α99 II

Consumer video cameras

 Canon XC10, 2015
 Sony Handycam
FDR-AX100, 2014
FDR-AXP33, 2015, with built-in projector
FDR-AX53, 2016
 FDR-AXP53, 2016, with built-in projector
 Panasonic
 HC-WX970, 2015
 HC-VX870, 2015
 HC-VXF990, 2016
 HC-VX980, 2016
 HC-VX1, 2016

Consumer cameras (no interchangeable lens) 

 Panasonic Lumix DMC-FZ300
 Panasonic Lumix DMC-FZ1000
 Panasonic Lumix DMC-LX100 - announced at photokina 2014
 Nikon Coolpix A900
 Nikon Coolpix B700
 Nikon Coolpix P1000
 Sony DSC-RX10 II (30 min max in 4K)
 Sony DSC-RX100 IV (5 min max recording due to heat - like 4K smartphones)

Mobile devices

Below 30 frames per second 
 Panasonic Lumix DMC-CM1 – 15 frames per second
 Acer Liquid S2 - The first 4K camera in a mobile device – 24fps

30 frames per second 
 Samsung Mobile
 Samsung Galaxy Note 3 (2013) (Snapdragon model) – The first mobile phone with 2160p at 30fps.
 Samsung Galaxy S5 (2014) – The first Samsung Galaxy S series mobile phone with 2160p video recording
 Samsung Galaxy Alpha
 Samsung Galaxy Note 4 (and Samsung Galaxy Note Edge)
 Samsung Galaxy S6 / Galaxy S6 Edge / Galaxy S6 Edge+
 Samsung Galaxy Note 5
 Samsung Galaxy S7 / Galaxy S7 Edge
 Samsung Galaxy Note 7 / Galaxy Note Fan Edition
 Samsung Galaxy S8 / Galaxy S8+
 Samsung Galaxy Note 8
 Samsung Galaxy A8 Star (2018) – First Galaxy A-series device with 4K recording.
 Samsung Galaxy A9 (2018)
 Samsung Galaxy A70
 Samsung Galaxy A80
 Samsung Galaxy A90 5G
 Samsung Galaxy A51 / Galaxy A71
Samsung Galaxy M51/Galaxy M31/Galaxy M21
Samsung Galaxy F41
Samsung Galaxy A52/Galaxy A72
Samsung Galaxy F62
Samsung Galaxy M62/Galaxy M42 5G

 Apple iPhone
 Apple iPhone 6S / iPhone 6S Plus (2015) – The first iPhones to record in 4K.
 Apple iPhone SE (2016) – same camera as Apple iPhone 6s 
 Apple iPhone 7 / 7 Plus

 Google Nexus and Google Pixel
 Google Nexus 6
 Google Nexus 6P
 Google Nexus 5X
 Google Pixel / Pixel XL
 Google Pixel 2 / Pixel 2 XL
 Google Pixel 3 / Pixel 3 XL
 Google Pixel 3a / Pixel 3a XL
 Google Pixel 4 / Pixel 4 XL

 LG
 LG G3 (2014) – Earliest known optically stabilized mobile 2160p video camera.
 LG G4
 LG G5
 LG G6
 LG G Flex (2014) – through subsequent software update
 LG G Flex 2
 LG G Pro 2
 LG V10
 LG V20
 LG V30 – 4K HDR (8-bit Log from 10-bit signal, can't record in 10 bit at all.)
 LG Velvet

 Nokia Lumia and Microsoft Lumia
 Nokia Lumia 930 – through subsequent software update
 Nokia Lumia Icon
 Nokia Lumia 1520 – through subsequent software update
 Microsoft Lumia 950
 Microsoft Lumia 950 XL

 Motorola
 Motorola Moto X (2nd generation)
 Motorola Moto X Style
 Motorola Droid Turbo
 Motorola Nexus 6

 OnePlus and Oppo
 OnePlus One – the first mobile device to support recording at both 4096 × 2160@24fps (DCi-4K or Full4K) and 3840 × 2160@30fps
 OnePlus 2
 OnePlus 3
 OnePlus 3T
 OnePlus 5
 OnePlus 5T
 OnePlus 6
 OnePlus 6T
 OnePlus 7 and 7 Pro
 OnePlus 7T and 7T Pro
 Oppo Find 7/7a

 Sony Xperia
 Sony Xperia Z Ultra
 Sony Xperia Z1 and Z1 Compact
 Sony Xperia Z2
 Sony Xperia A2
 Sony Xperia J1 Compact
 Sony Xperia ZL2
 Sony Xperia Z2a
 Sony Xperia Z3 and Z3 Compact
 Sony Xperia Z4 and Z4 Compact
 Sony Xperia A4
 Sony Xperia Z5, Z5 Premium and Z5 Compact
 Sony Xperia M5
 Sony Xperia XZ / XZ Dual and XZs
 Sony Xperia XZ Premium, XZ1 and XZ1 Compact
 Sony XPeria XZ2, XZ2 Premium, XZ3 and XZ2 Compact – World's first "4K HDR" recording on a phone. Can be deactivated optionally.
 Sony Xperia 1 and 5
 Sony Xperia 1 II

 Xiaomi
 Xiaomi Mi 3 (using unofficial/modded software)
 Xiaomi Mi 4
 Xiaomi Mi 5 and Mi 5s
 Xiaomi Mi 6
 Xiaomi Mi 8
 Xiaomi Mi 9,
 Xiaomi Mi 9T and Mi 9T Pro
 Xiaomi Mi 10
 Xiaomi Mi 10T and Mi 10T Pro
 Xiaomi Mi A1
 Xiaomi Mi A2
 Xiaomi Mi A3
 Xiaomi Redmi Note 3 (Snapdragon model)
 Xiaomi Redmi Note 4 (using third party camera apps)
 Xiaomi Redmi Note 5
 Xiaomi Redmi Note 6
 Xiaomi Redmi Note 7
 Xiaomi Redmi Note 8
 Xiaomi Redmi Note 9 Pro
 Xiaomi Redmi Note 9
Xiaomi Redmi Note 10 pro
 Xiaomi Poco X3 NFC
 Xiaomi Poco F1
 Xiaomi Poco F2 Pro / Redmi K30 Pro

 Huawei
 Huawei P10 and P10 Plus
 Huawei P20 and P20 Pro
 Huawei Mate 9, Mate 9 Pro and Mate 9 Porsche Design edition
 Huawei Mate 10, Mate 10 Pro and Mate 10 Porsche Design edition
 Huawei Nova 3

 Other vendors
Vendors with only few listed devices

 BlackBerry Priv
 HTC One M9
 HTC 10
 Lenovo Vibe Z2 Pro
 Meizu MX4 Pro
 Meizu MX4
 Razer Phone 2
 Sharp SH-01G

60 frames per second 
 Samsung Mobile
 Samsung Galaxy S9 / Galaxy S9+ - Capable of recording at 4K@60 or 30fps with official support from Samsung.
 Samsung Galaxy Note 9 - Capable of recording at 4K@60 or 30fps with official support from Samsung.
 Samsung Galaxy S10e / Galaxy S10 / Galaxy S10+ / Galaxy S10 5G / Galaxy S10 Lite
 Samsung Galaxy S20 / Galaxy S20+ / Galaxy S20 Ultra / Galaxy S20 5G / Galaxy S20+ 5G / Galaxy S20 Ultra 5G - First phone to record 8K resolution at 24fps
 Samsung Galaxy Note 10 / Galaxy Note 10+ / Galaxy Note 10 5G / Galaxy Note 10+ 5G
 Samsung Galaxy Note 20 / Galaxy Note 20 Ultra / Galaxy Note 20 5G / Galaxy Note 20 Ultra 5G

 Apple iPhone
 Apple iPhone 8 / iPhone 8 Plus and iPhone X, 4K@60, 30 or 24fps with official support from Apple.
 Apple iPhone XS / iPhone XS Max and iPhone XR
 Apple iPhone 11 and iPhone 11 Pro / iPhone 11 Pro Max
Apple iPhone SE (2nd generation) - same camera as iPhone 8
Apple iPhone 12 / iPhone 12 Mini and iPhone 12 Pro / iPhone 12 Pro Max

 Asus
Asus Zenfone 5Z
Asus Zenfone 6
Asus ROG Phone II
Asus ROG Phone III

 Huawei
 Huawei P40 series or later
 Huawei Mate 30 series or later
 Huawei Mate Xs or later
 Honor V30 series
 Honor 30 Pro/Pro+

LG
 LG G7 ThinQ
 LG G8 ThinQ
 LG G8X ThinQ
 LG G8S ThinQ
 LG V35
 LG V40
 LG V50
 LG V60

 Xiaomi
Xiaomi Mi 10 5G
Xiaomi Mi 10T and Mi 10T Pro
Poco F1
 Poco F2 Pro / Redmi K30 Pro

 OnePlus
 OnePlus 6 or later

Realme
Realme GT Neo/Realme GT
Realme X3/X3 Superzoom
Realme Q3 Pro or later

120 frames per second 
 Sony Xperia
 Sony Xperia 1 II or later
 Sony Xperia 5 II or later
 OnePlus
 OnePlus 9 Pro or later (5 minutes only)
 ZTE
 ZTE Nubia Z40 Pro or later
 ZTE Axon 40 Ultra or later
 ASUS
 Asus ZenFone 7 or later (slow motion only)

Rugged Compact Cameras 
 Olympus Tough TG-5

Wearable cameras
 GoPro HERO3 Black Edition (2012) – 4K (15 fps) and DCI 4K (12 fps), fixed "Ultra Wide" Field of view
 GoPro HERO3+ Black Edition (slim) - , 4K (15 fps) and DCI 4K (12 fps), fixed "Ultra Wide" field of view
GoPro HERO4 (2015) - 4k at up to 30fps (black edition)
GoPro HERO5 (2016) - 4k at up to 30fps (black edition) and added a USB-C Port and Touchscreen
GoPro HERO6 (2017) - 4k at up to 60fps (black edition) and improved EIS (Electronic Image Stabilization)
GoPro HERO7 (2017) - 4k at up to 60fps (black edition), HyperSmooth (advanced image stabilization) at 30fps and improved EIS (Electronic Image Stabilization) at 60fps
Nikon KeyMission 170 - 4K at 30fps
YI 4K+ (2015) - 4k at up to 60fps and EIS (Electronic Image Stabilization) at 4k 30fps
Sony actioncam FDR-X3000R
RealAction Pro

See also

4K resolution

Notes

References

External links

Articles

Official sites of NHK

Video

Digital imaging
Digital video recorders
Film and video technology
Ultra-high-definition television
Electronics lists